Cole Smith (born October 28, 1995) is an American professional ice hockey player currently playing with the  Nashville Predators of the National Hockey League (NHL).

Early life
Smith was born in Brainerd, Minnesota. He played junior hockey in Canada with the Steinbach Pistons of the Manitoba Junior Hockey League before joining the North Dakota Fighting Hawks in 2016. In his senior year of college hockey (2019–2020), Smith was a key component of a Fighting Hawks team that posted the top regular season record in the National Collegiate Hockey Conference (NCHC) but was unable to compete for the conference and national championships because of the COVID-19 pandemic. Smith was named as a finalist for the NCHC's top defensive forward award.

Career 
Upon leaving the University of North Dakota, Smith signed a one-year contract with the Nashville Predators on March 19, 2020, but did not see any action during the 2020 Stanley Cup playoffs. He played five games with the Florida Everblades of the ECHL in December 2020 before joining the Predators' training camp for the pandemic-shortened 2020–21 season. He was named to the Predators' "taxi squad" but then recalled to the active roster for the start of the season, making his NHL debut on January 14, 2021, against the Columbus Blue Jackets.

On January 21, 2023, Smith scored his first career goal in a game against the Los Angeles Kings.

Career statistics

References

External links

1995 births
Living people
American ice hockey forwards
Chicago Wolves players
Florida Everblades players
Ice hockey players from Minnesota
Milwaukee Admirals players
Nashville Predators players
North Dakota Fighting Hawks men's ice hockey players
Steinbach Pistons players
People from Brainerd, Minnesota
Undrafted National Hockey League players